Schottentor  is a station on  of the Vienna U-Bahn. It is located in the Innere Stadt District, below Maria-Theresien-Straße. It opened in 1980.

The station is an interchange node between U2 and 10 tramway lines, 5 of them using a small  underground section as a terminal station.

The name of the station derives from the Schottentor, a former city gate in the Vienna city wall, which was demolished in 1860.

References

External links 
 

Buildings and structures in Innere Stadt
Railway stations opened in 1980
Vienna U-Bahn stations